Bethesda-Chevy Chase can refer to:
 The Bethesda-Chevy Chase sub-area, consisting of the neighboring census locations of Bethesda and Chevy Chase, Maryland
 Bethesda-Chevy Chase High School